Alex Aust is an American women’s lacrosse player. Having played with the Maryland Terrapins at the collegiate level, she was named to the US national team for the 2015-16 season and is currently still an active member, wearing jersey number 10. In 2016, she was selected by the Baltimore Ride with their second pick overall in the inaugural United Women's Lacrosse League Draft.

Playing career

High school
Aust attended Bullis School in Potomac, Maryland from 2005 to 2009. During her time there, she was a three-sport standout athlete in field hockey, lacrosse and basketball. As a junior, Aust was first team All American selection and competed with the club team known as the Capital Lacrosse Club.  In addition to this, she earned the accolades of All-ISL first team, All-MET honorable mention, all-county, and All-Gazette first team honors. As a senior, Aust was named All-Gazette in both field hockey and basketball as well as being recognized as All-ISL, All-Met second team, All-Gazette, Under Armour All-American and squad MVP in lacrosse. Aust was debating between playing basketball or lacrosse at the collegiate level, but ultimately could not pass up the opportunity to play lacrosse under Cathy Reese at the University of Maryland.

NCAA
In every one of her four seasons with the Terrapins, the program boasted an ACC championship. As a freshman in 2010, she was a member of the NCAA national championship team. During the 2012 ACC Tournament, she set a tournament record for most assists (13) and points (17). She would set a career-high for most goals in one game with five, achieving the feat against Virginia on March 1, 2013. As a side note, her younger sister Nicole was a teammate for two seasons.

Aust graduated from Maryland with 132 career assists, third-best in program history. In addition, she logged 275 points, which placed her sixth all-time among Terrapins female lacrosse players. After graduation, she would return to the Terrapins as the Director of Operations with the Maryland women's lacrosse program.

UWLX
Aust played in the first game in Baltimore Ride history, but did not register a point. In the Ride’s second game, a 17-16 loss to the Boston Storm, Aust set a league and team record for most goals in a game. She would score a hat trick in the first and second half of the game, logging six goals overall.

Other
In 2013, Aust became an Under Armour sponsored athlete. Two years later, Aust was named as the first female spokesperson for the HEADstrong Foundation. In 2014, Aust became the director of Finish Line Lacrosse, an organization dedicated to running lacrosse camps and clinics for young female lacrosse players all over the United States.  In addition, Aust helps organize elite recruiting tournaments in order for athletes to gain exposure to collegiate coaches. From 2013 to 2015, Aust was the Director of Operations for the University of Maryland Women's Lacrosse Team. This job included organizing team travel, gear/equipment, camp/tournament registration, and schedules. Aust  supports the Give and Go Foundation, a charity designed to grow the game of lacrosse globally which was co-founded by Premier Lacrosse League players Adam Ghitelman and Scott Ratliff. With this charity, she volunteers as a coach and travels across the world to spread the game.

Aust is represented by Athelo Group, a sports agency based out of Stamford, Connecticut.

Awards and honors
2012 ACC championship all-tournament team 
2012, IWLCA Second Team All-American
2012, Second Team All-American
2013, Finalist, Tewaaraton Award
2013, First Team All-ACC
2013, First Team All-American
2013 IWLCA National Attacker of the Year 
2013 Synapse Sport National Attacker of the Year
2016 UWLX All-Star Selection
2017 Team USA Gold Medalist

References

Living people
American lacrosse players
Maryland Terrapins women's lacrosse players
Year of birth missing (living people)
21st-century American women